A baton charge is a coordinated tactic for dispersing crowds of people, usually used by police or military in response to public disorder.  In South Asia, a long bamboo stick, called lathi in Hindi, is used for crowd control, and the expression lathi charge commonly employed to describe the action.

The tactic involves police officers charging at a crowd of people with batons and in some cases, riot shields. They run at the crowd hitting people with their batons, and in some situations use riot shields to push them away. Baton charging is designed to cause pain or fear of pain, in the hope that they would be compelled to move away from the scene, dispersing the public who are crowded.

South Asia 
In South Asia, notably India, Bangladesh, Pakistan, and Sri Lanka, a long bamboo stick, or staff, called lathi is used for crowd control. The term lathi charge is used by the Indian media.

See also
Lala Lajpat Rai
Bhagat Singh
Riot control
Snatch squad
Protesting
Police brutality

References

Riots
 Crowd control